



































Lists of country codes